Aris T. Allen (December 27, 1910 – February 8, 1991) was an American politician who was the first African-American chair of the Maryland Republican party and the first to run for a statewide office in Maryland.

Background 
Aris Allen was born in San Antonio, Texas, on December 27, 1910. He attended public schools in San Antonio and Washington, D.C., and graduated from Dunbar High School in Washington. He attended Howard University and Howard University Medical School, earning an M.D. in 1944.

Allen was president of his class at Howard University in Washington, D.C. Allen married Faye E. Watson in 1947; the couple had two children.

Allen served as a pilot in a United States Army Specialized Training Program in 1942, and was an Air Force flight surgeon from 1953 to 1955.

Medicine 
Allen started his medical career as a medical resident at Freedman's Hospital, Washington, D.C., in 1944 and 1945, then went into private practice in Annapolis. He received the Maryland Medical Association award for outstanding achievements in medicine and civic affairs in 1967. He was also the medical affairs advisor to the Health Care Financing Administration in Maryland from 1981 to 1989, a member of the Board of Medical Examiners of Maryland, and director of the Health Standards and Quality Board of the Health Care Financing Administration. He was a board member of the Maryland Academy of Family Physicians and president of the medical staff of Anne Arundel Medical Center.

Education 
Allen devoted much of his time to the education of youth in Maryland. He was the first African American to be appointed to the Anne Arundel County Board of Education, was a member of the board of the Anne Arundel Community College, a Trustee of the Anne Arundel County Public Library, and was vice chair for the board of regents at Morgan State University.

Civic involvement 
Allen served on the boards of the YMCA, the Salvation Army, the Community Chest of Anne Arundel County, the Red Cross, the Annapolis Chamber of Commerce and the Annapolis chapter of the American Cancer Society; he was a life member of the NAACP, a member of Alpha Phi Alpha fraternity (Eta Eta Lambda chapter), and a member of the Board of stewards for his church, Mount Moriah A. M. E.

In the legislature 
Allen first served in the House of Delegates representing Anne Arundel County from 1967 to 1974 and then from 1990 to 1991. During his tenure in the House he was Minority whip from 1967 to 1974 and a member of the Constitutional and Administrative Law Committee, 1967–74. In the Maryland Senate he served on the Finance Committee from 1979 to 1981.
 1990 Race for Maryland House of Delegates – District 30
Voters to choose three:
{| class="wikitable"
!Name
!Votes
!Percent
!Outcome
|-
|-
|John Astle, Dem.
|18,009
|  23%
|   Won
|-
|-
|Aris T. Allen, Rep.
|16,951
|  22%
|   Won
|-
|-
|Michael E. Busch, Dem.
|16,104
|  18%
|   Won
|-
|-
|Edith Segree, Dem.
|14,341
|  18%
|   Lost
|-
|-
|Phillip D. Bissett, Rep.
|13,321
|  17%
|   Lost
|}

Republican activist
Chair, Maryland state Republican Party. Chair of the Maryland delegates to the Republican National Convention, 1972. NAACP county conference award, 1976. Chair, Republican State Central Committee, 1977–79. Rotary International Paul Harris Fellowship, 1978. Candidate for lieutenant governor of Maryland, 1978. Convention secretary, Republican National Convention, 1980.
Gubernatorial General Election Results, 1978
{| class="wikitable"
!Candidates
!Votes
!Percent
!Outcome
|-
|-
|Harry R. Hughes/Samuel W. Bogley Dem.
|718,328
|  70.98%
|   Won
|-
|-
|John Glenn Beall Jr./Aris T. Allen Rep.
|293,635
|  29.02%
|   Lost
|}

Legacy 
Dr. Allen died of a self-inflicted gunshot wound after being ill with cancer in Annapolis, February 8, 1991.

A freeway, Aris T. Allen Boulevard (Maryland Route 665), is named for Allen, who died the year prior to its completion. State officials planned to erect a memorial to Allen in the median of his namesake boulevard, but the memorial was placed in a nearby park so that his wife could visit.

The text of the memorial reads:
"A man of honor...A distinguished career of professional and public service...As a Medical Doctor...As a member of the Maryland State Legislature...As an appointee of The President of the United States, to serve his Country on the National level...And as a caring person who has served his community in so many other ways...To help people in need...To provide opportunity for every citizen..."And to set an example that brings out the very best in us".

Notes 

1910 births
1991 suicides
Politicians from San Antonio
African-American United States Air Force personnel
African-American state legislators in Maryland
20th-century African-American physicians
20th-century American physicians
American primary care physicians
American politicians who committed suicide
Howard University College of Medicine alumni
Republican Party Maryland state senators
Republican Party members of the Maryland House of Delegates
Military personnel from Texas
State political party chairs of Maryland
Suicides by firearm in Maryland
Physicians from Maryland
Physicians from Texas
United States Army officers
United States Air Force officers
20th-century American politicians
20th-century African-American politicians
African-American men in politics
African-American United States Army personnel
African Americans in World War II